

Test cricket 
Records complete to Women's Test #140. Last updated 21 July 2019.

One Day International 
Records complete to WODI #1166. Last updated 9 October 2019.

Twenty20 International 
Last updated 21 February 2020.

Note: Australia Women won a Super Over against England Women and won a Bowl-out against New Zealand Women. They lost a Super Over against England Women as well.

References 

Australia women's national cricket team